Scooby-Doo! Stage Fright is a 2013 direct-to-DVD animated musical comedy horror film, and the twenty-first entry in the direct-to-video series of Scooby-Doo films. It was released on August 20, 2013, by Warner Premiere, the last film to be released under this label due to its dissolution the previous year. The movie made it's linear premiere on Cartoon Network in the United States on March 25, 2023.

Plot

The Mystery Inc. gang head to Chicago, Illinois for a talent show, called Talent Star, hosted by Brick Pimiento, where songwriting duo Fred and Daphne are finalists with some high hopes. Upon arrival, they learn that the opera house which the show will be held in is being terrorized by a Phantom, who is intensely lauding one of the finalists to win, Chrissy, a spoiled girl whose noisy parents are no more polite than she is. Fred and Daphne also befriend one of the finalists, Emma Gale, a violinist. Not wanting to be left out, Scooby and Shaggy decide to show Pimiento a juggling act, which they are betting will take the contest by storm. However, after Pimiento states his belief that "juggling stinks," throughout the film, the two continually approach Pimiento and show him numerous desperate impromptu acts, all of which are terrible.

Not long after checking in for the talent show, the Phantom appears in the opera house and Fred, Daphne and Velma attempt to catch him using the surveillance cameras, but are unsuccessful due to the Phantom’s ability to seemingly appear in multiple places at once. While being chased briefly by the Phantom, Shaggy and Scooby notice the Phantom had a strange lemon scent and afterwards, the gang split up to search for clues. Fred and Daphne meet the owner of the opera house Mel Richmond. They learn from Richmond that a Phantom once terrorized the opera house thirty-five years ago when it was a disco.

The dress rehearsal commences the next day. Fred and Daphne meet Emma’s parents, who are hoping to get the prize money to save their home from bankruptcy. During the dress rehearsal, the Phantom sabotages most of the finalists’ acts, leaving Chrissy, Emma, and Fred and Daphne as the only contestants left. Due to these attacks, Fred and Daphne decide to use themselves as bait to lure the Phantom out. The gang manage to track down a Phantom, only to find it is the original Phantom, a man named Steve Trilby. Steve admits to the gang that he vandalized the opera house due to his hatred for disco music, but that now he only goes into the opera house to get food. The gang return to the stage to find the Phantom setting fire to the opera house. With the help of Steve, they catch the Phantom, who is revealed to be Mel Richmond, hoping to collect the insurance as the opera house was making go bankrupt. However, the gang learn that Richmond is not the Phantom they are after when they hear the Phantom threatening to destroy the place unless Chrissy wins, after Richmond states that he got the idea from the previous Phantom attacks.

Later that night, using Emma as bait, the gang manage to capture the Phantom, who turns out to be Chrissy's father Lance wearing a girdle. Afterwards, however, Shaggy and Scooby find out that assistant director Dewey Ottoman is also the Phantom, when they see him putting on lemon-scented hand sanitizer. They rush to Ottoman's office and find a magazine about the Soap Diamond, which is on display at a mineralogical center nearby. They quickly realize Ottoman ordered all the police to patrol the opera house so that the mineralogical center would be unguarded. They rush to the mineralogical center and find Ottoman running out of the building. Ottoman trips and drops the Soap Diamond, which Scooby catches. Ottoman pursues the gang toward a drawbridge, where Fred tricks him into jumping into a barge filled with garbage, by replacing the diamond with a dog bone. Ottoman is arrested and the gang goes back to the opera house, after being informed that Fred and Daphne are doing a tie-breaking performance against Emma.

The gang arrives back in time for Fred and Daphne to do their tie-breaker performance. The performance takes them in the lead of the voting chart. When they realize what it would mean if Emma lost, they decide to tell some of Shaggy and Scooby's cheesy jokes which enables them to lose enough votes and allowing Emma to win. At the end of the show, Velma plays the footage which shows Pimiento putting on the Phantom costume. Pimiento confesses that he only used the Phantom to boost the show's ratings. After Pimento is taken away by the police, Steve wraps up the show, which impresses K.T.

During the credits, the gang stops at a gas station where they see the news that Steve has become the new host of Talent Star after the show has been renewed for a tenth season. Velma advises Daphne to talk to Fred about their possible relationship as Shaggy and Scooby advise Fred to do the same thing. Then they head out to Goose Lake to solve the mystery of the Goose Lake Monster.

Voice cast
 Frank Welker as Scooby-Doo and Fred Jones
 Matthew Lillard as Shaggy Rogers
 Grey DeLisle as Daphne Blake, Amy 
 Mindy Cohn as Velma Dinkley
 Isabella Acres as Emma Gale
 Troy Baker as Phantom, Lance Damon
 Eric Bauza as K.T.
 Jeff Bennett as Mike Gale, Mel Richmond
 Wayne Brady as Brick Pimiento
 Vivica A. Fox as Lotte Lavoie
 Kate Higgins as Meg Gale, Cathy
 Peter MacNicol as Dewey Ottoman
 Candi Milo as Barb Damon
 John O'Hurley as The Great Pauldini
 Cristina Pucelli as Colette
 Kevin Michael Richardson as Security Guard #1, Hotel Clerk
 Paul Rugg as Steve Trilby
 Tara Sands as Nancy
 Tara Strong as Donna, News Anchor
 Travis Willingham as Waldo
 Ariel Winter as Chrissy Damon
 Keith Ferguson as Security Guard #2

Critical response
DVD Verdict offered that the plot was an unoriginal "rip-off of the classic The Phantom of the Opera" mixed with "overtones of American Idol" as well as other "reality based music shows". They also offered that while Blu-ray quality gives the film a ghoulish quality, it would be scary to only the youngest viewers. They noted Frank Welker as the voice of Fred, being the only holdover from the original series, and Matthew Lillard's return as the voice of Shaggy. They also offered that Mindy Cohn "fits in well as nerdy Velma" and that Vivica A. Fox, Peter MacNicol, and Wayne Brady in supporting roles "make the film slightly more interesting for adults who want to play the 'is that so-and-so's voice?' game."  They concluded that for children, the film "will probably be a lot of fun and somewhat thrilling", due to the car and foot chases and its various adventures, but that "adults will find it to be a bit tedious, but if that surprises you, clearly you haven't spent much time around children's entertainment."

Common Sense Media, in their review of the film, deemed it a generic Scooby-Doo movie, giving it 3 out of 5 stars, while noting the greater degree of romance it compared to most other Scooby-Doo films. They praised Brady's performance as Brick Pimiento, calling it "extremely believable".

References

External links

 

2013 films
Scooby-Doo direct-to-video animated films
Films about television
Films set in Chicago
2013 direct-to-video films
2010s American animated films
American children's animated mystery films
American children's animated comedy films
2010s children's animated films
2010s English-language films
Films directed by Victor Cook